Pete Sampras defeated Andre Agassi in the final, 6–4, 6–3, 6–2 to win the men's singles tennis title at the 1990 US Open. It was his first major title, and the first of a then-record 14 men's singles major titles overall.

Boris Becker was the defending champion, but lost to Agassi in the semifinals. 

Sampras defeated Ivan Lendl in the quarterfinals, ending Lendl's record streak of eight consecutive men's finals appearances at the US Open.

Seeds
The seeded players are listed below. Pete Sampras is the champion; others show the round in which they were eliminated.

  Stefan Edberg (first round)
  Boris Becker (semifinalist)
  Ivan Lendl (quarterfinalist)
  Andre Agassi (finalist)
  Andrés Gómez (first round)
  Thomas Muster (fourth round)
  Emilio Sánchez (fourth round)
  Brad Gilbert (third round)
  Aaron Krickstein (quarterfinalist)
  Andrei Chesnokov (third round)
  Michael Chang (third round)
  Pete Sampras (champion)
  Jay Berger (fourth round)
  Jim Courier (second round)
  Goran Ivanišević (third round)
  Martín Jaite (second round)

Draw

Finals

Top half

Section 1

Section 2

Section 3

Section 4

Bottom half

Section 5

Section 6

Section 7

Section 8

External links
 Association of Tennis Professionals (ATP) – 1990 US Open Men's Singles draw
1990 US Open – Men's draws and results at the International Tennis Federation

Men's singles
US Open (tennis) by year – Men's singles